Ulrich "Uli" Kapp (born 14 April 1971 in Füssen) is a retired German curler from Übersee.

Career
Kapp has played third for his brother Andy Kapp since 1992. Together, they have won European Curling Championships (1992 and 1997), two silver medals at the World Curling Championships (1997, 2007) and three bronze medals (1994, 1995 and 2005). He competed for Germany at the 1998 and 2006 Winter Olympics, finishing in eighth place on both occasions. Kapp had to have season-ending knee surgery after the 2007 European Curling Championships, and thus could not attend the 2008 World Men's Curling Championship with the rest of his team. He retired from professional curling in 2009.

Kapp has worked as a curling commentator for Eurosport for over 10 years.

Personal life
Kapp has two children. He has a Magister Juris and works as a sport business consultant. He enjoys reading, travelling, biking, and gardening.

References

External links
 
 Website

German male curlers
1971 births
Sportspeople from Munich
Living people
Curlers at the 1998 Winter Olympics
Curlers at the 2006 Winter Olympics
Olympic curlers of Germany
European curling champions
German curling coaches
People from Rosenheim (district)
Sportspeople from Upper Bavaria
People from Traunstein (district)